Cuz may refer to:

 CUZ (band), an indie rock band featuring Mike Watt of Minutemen and Sam Dook of The Go! Team
 Alejandro Velasco Astete International Airport (IATA code CUZ), in Cusco, Peru
 Catholic University in Zimbabwe (or CUZ), Harare, Zimbabwe
 Communication University of Zhejiang, China

See also
1.Cuz, Swedish rapper from Hässelby in Stockholm, born in Somalia